Paul Pedroncelli is an American professional stock car racing driver. He competes full-time in the ARCA Menards Series West, driving the No. 31 Chevrolet for Pedroncelli Motorsports. He is the father of P. J. Pedroncelli.

Racing career

ARCA Menards Series West
Pedroncelli made his ARCA Menards Series West debut in 2021 at Sonoma Raceway finishing 13th. Pedroncelli ran 8 out the 9 races. At the Portland International Raceway, Pedroncelli got his first top ten finish, coming in 9th.

Motorsports career results

ARCA Menards Series

ARCA Menards Series West

References 

Living people
ARCA Menards Series drivers
NASCAR drivers
Racing drivers from California
People from Sonoma, California
Year of birth missing (living people)